Yusuf Yazbek (1901–1982) was a Lebanese journalist and politician who cofounded the Lebanese People’s Party which was the forerunner of the Lebanese Communist Party. He was also involved in the establishment of the Syrian–Lebanese Communist Party.

Early life
Yazbek was born in 1901. He was from a Maronite family. He stayed in Mexico during his childhood where he met a Lebanese poet and journalist Said Akl. Yazbek and Said Akl returned to Lebanon before World War I. Then Yazbek joined the opposition groups against the Ottoman rule in the region, and Akl launched a newspaper, Al Bayrak, in 1911.

Career and activities
Yazbek worked as a secretary-interpreter in the Department of Emigration at the Beirut port. In the period between 1922 and 1924 he was one of the editors of a semi-weekly labor newspaper entitled as Sahafi et Ta'ih (Arabic: The Wandering Journalist) based in Zahlé, Lebanon. He published his articles using the pseudonym the Weeping Ghost. He also wrote for a journal entitled Al Marad. In October 1924 he and Fuad Shimali, a Lebanese tobacco worker, established the Lebanese People’s Party which would be renamed as Lebanese Communist Party in the 1940s. It was approved by the authorities as a legal political party on 30 April 1925. Yazbek was elected as the secretary general of the party and resigned from his job at the port. Next he and others in the central committee of the party launched a weekly newspaper entitled Al Insaniyya (Arabic: Humanity) which was one of the early communist publications in Lebanon. Yazbek was named as its editor-in-chief. However, the paper was closed by the French authorities after publishing five issues on 17 June 1925. In the aftermath of this incident Yazbek left Lebanon for France in July 1925 and began to work for L'Humanité newspaper in Paris. 

Yazbek was removed from the Communist Party in 1926, and Shimali succeeded him as the secretary general. Yazbek returned to the country in December 1926. He was among the founders of the Syrian Lebanese Communist Party which was established by the split groups from the Lebanese People’s Party and the Spartacus Group, an Armenian Bolshevik party. He and Artin Madoyan were both arrested by the French mandatory forces in the late 1926 and imprisoned on the island of Arward until 1928.

Later years and death
He was one of the leftist figures who gave lectures in Beirut's Cénacle Hall in the late 1940s. He died in 1982.

Work
Yazbek was the author of the book entitled Hikayat awwal nuwwar fi al-'alam fi lubnan (Arabic: The Story of May Day in the World and in Lebanon) which was published in Beirut in 1974. He also published another book, The Conference of Martyrs, in 1955.

References

20th-century newspaper founders
20th-century Lebanese writers
1901 births
1982 deaths
Lebanese Communist Party politicians
Lebanese journalists
Lebanese newspaper founders
Lebanese prisoners and detainees
Lebanese Maronites
Political party founders
Lebanese expatriates in France